Crawford Hallock Greenewalt (August 16, 1902 – September 28, 1993) was an American chemical engineer who served as president of the DuPont Company from 1948 to 1962 and as board chairman from 1962 to 1967.

Early life

Crawford Hallock Greenewalt was born in Cummington, Massachusetts, the son of Frank Lindsay Greenewalt and Mary Hallock-Greenewalt, an inventor and pianist born in Beirut. In 1922, he earned a Bachelor of Science degree in chemical engineering from Massachusetts Institute of Technology, where he joined Theta Chi fraternity. He later became a Life Member of the MIT Corporation in 1951, and emeritus in 1977.

Career 
While at DuPont, Greenewalt was a key figure in their development of nylon and their nuclear power program. He was awarded the Lavoisier Medal for Technical Achievement by the DuPont Company in 1991.

His widely varied interests included ornithology and high-speed photography via his friend Harold E. "Doc" Edgerton. Greenewalt published a book of 70 high-speed photographs of hummingbirds in 1960 (Greenewalt, C.H. 1960. Hummingbirds Doubleday & Co., Garden City, New York.). And later, Dimensional relationships for flying animals Washington. Smithsonian Institution, 1962. In 1968, he published Bird Song. Acoustics and Physiology Smithsonian Institution Press, Washington, D.C. He also served as president of the American Philosophical Society.

Greenewalt is the subject of the film The Uncommon Man: Crawford H. Greenewalt, produced by the Atomic Heritage Foundation.

Personal life 
Greenewalt and his wife Margaretta (née Du Pont) had two sons, Crawford "Greenie" Greenewalt Jr. (1937-2012) and David Greenewalt, and daughter, Nancy L. Frederick. The younger Crawford was a professor of classical archaeology at the University of California, Berkeley who was among the leaders of the Archaeological Exploration of Sardis. David died in 2003.

He died in Wilmington, Delaware one day after having a stroke.

See also
John Mulchaey, holds the Crawford H. Greenewalt chair at the Carnegie Observatories, of which he is also the director

References

External links

1965 Audio Interview with Crawford Greenewalt by Stephane Groueff Voices of the Manhattan Project

In memoriam: Crawford H. Greenewalt
The Crawford Greenewalt Manhattan Project Diaries
 Finding aid for Crawford Greenewalt photograph collection at Hagley Museum and Library

1902 births
1993 deaths
People from Cummington, Massachusetts
DuPont people
American chemical engineers
William Penn Charter School alumni
MIT School of Engineering alumni
United States Army Science Board people
Manhattan Project people
20th-century American engineers
Member of the Mont Pelerin Society